The volleyball (Spanish:Voleibol) tournaments, for the 2013 Bolivarian Games in Trujillo, starts on the 16 and ends on 29 November 2013. The indoor volleyball competition takes place at Coliseo Gran Chimu, in the Víctor Larco Herrera district in Trujillo.

Participating teams

Medal table
Key:

Medalists

References

Events at the 2013 Bolivarian Games
2013 in volleyball
Volleyball at the Bolivarian Games
International volleyball competitions hosted by Peru